Nathaniel Booth may refer to:

 Nathaniel Booth, 4th Baron Delamer (1709–1770), English peer
 Nathaniel Booth (slave) (1826–1901), escaped African-American slave